Poetry Chain is an English poetry journal of India published quarterly from Thiruvananthapuram, Kerala, India. The Indian English poet Gopi Kottoor is its founder editor. The journal was founded in 1997 with the mentoring of the Indian poet Ayyappa Paniker, who was involved with the journal until his death in 2007. In 2009 it was relaunched as online-only publication.

Inception and growth
Poetry Chain started in 1997 as an informal platform for budding poets. Over the years it has acquired substance and stature under the able guidance of Gopi Kottoor and his circle of poet collaborators. The journal's life patrons include Sitakant Mahapatra, Dr HK Kaul (Poetry Society, India), and Padmasree award winner Jayanta Mahapatra. The journal has published internationally renowned poets like Jayanta Mahapatra along acclaimed as well as lesser known poets from all over India. The journal went on to discover many new talents, especially young voices on the poetry horizon. Poets who have read under the Poetry Chain banner include Ruth Padel, Tapan Kumar Pradhan and Meena Alexander. The Awards for poetry instituted by Poetry Chain and in collaboration with The Poetry Society (India) are the Father, Wake Us In Passing Poetry Prize, Agha Shahid Ali Poetry Prize, and The Best Chosen Poet of the year.

In July 2009, the journal became an online-only publication.

New Poetry Chain
The New Poetry Chain which is a part of Indian Writers Association. Gopi Kottoor is one out of seven member of the advisory board of Indian Writers Association.

Poetry get-together
Poetry Chain has been organizing periodic get-together of poets to facilitate exchange of ideas. From June 2013, Poetry Chain has started conducting monthly meeting of both aspiring and established poets. The meeting is conducted in the last Saturday of every month.

Poetry Chain has become a platform of interaction for Indian poets writing in English residing in different parts of the country. Although Poetry Chain journal has a pan Indian flavor, it has occasionally highlighted local Kerala based themes like Onam also.

Publication  
 A New Book of Indian Poems In English (2000) ed. by Gopi Kottoor and published by Poetry Chain and Writers Workshop, Calcutta

References

External links
 Official website

1997 establishments in Kerala
Defunct magazines published in India
English-language magazines published in India
Indian literature websites
Indian poetry
Literary magazines published in India
Magazines established in 1997
Magazines disestablished in 2007
Online literary magazines
Online magazines published in India
Online magazines with defunct print editions
Poetry literary magazines
Quarterly magazines published in India